Terry Moore may refer to:

Terry Moore (actress) (born 1929), American film actress
Terry Moore (Australian footballer) (born 1951), Australian rules footballer
Terry Moore (baseball) (1912–1995), American Major League Baseball player
Terry Moore (broadcaster) (1936–2018), Canadian broadcaster, actor and television personality 
Terry Moore (cartoonist) (born 1954), American comic book writer and artist
Terry Moore (musician), New Zealand musician
Terry Moore (politician), American politician from Montana
Terry Moore (soccer) (born 1958), retired Canadian footballer
Terry A. Moore (born 1965), Alabama jurist

See also
Terry Moor (born 1952), tennis player
Terence Moore, sportswriter
Terence Moore (American football), American football linebacker